Robert Godier Bottom, better known as Bob Bottom, is a retired Australian investigative journalist and author.

Career
In the words of Malcolm Brown in The Sydney Morning Herald, Bottom made "heroic, ground breaking efforts to expose organised crime" and "did more than any other single individual to bring crime and corruption to public attention in NSW in the 1970s and 1980s". At times, he and his family were afforded 24-hour police protection.

Because of the scale of information confided to him as a trusted contact for crime intelligence operatives, Bottom has been hired to advise insight teams of The Age and the Sydney Morning Herald and has been a known source for countless exposes by other investigative journalists, often making him a target for threats, smears and vilification.

One of his most famous exposes, the release in 1984 through The Age newspaper of material on identities and rackets from telephone taps illegally carried out by undercover police in New South Wales, provoked state and national inquiries and ultimately prompted governments to allow law enforcement agencies to legally use telephone interception in organised crime cases.

Over the years, he has participated in 18 Royal Commission and other judicial and parliamentary inquiries and has played a key role in the establishment of state and national institutions to combat organised crime and corruption.

He sparked his first inquiry into the New South Wales police force with an exposé in The Bulletin magazine in 1963 with an article titled Behind the Barrier. Writing later for the Sunday Telegraph, he was credited with helping force Australia's first Royal Commission into organised crime – the Moffitt Royal Commission in NSW in 1973 which resulted in police setting up crime intelligence units throughout Australia.

A report he wrote for the NSW Government in 1978, titled Report Upon Organised Crime In NSW, first recommended a separate crime commission concept for Australia. At that time, he had been working as a government adviser.

He was consulted by then Prime Minister Malcolm Fraser before announcing a National Crimes Commission in late 1982 and was a delegate to a National Crime Summit in July 1983 when the new government of Prime Minister Bob Hawke opted to transform the Fraser model into the National Crime Authority.

In 1986, his concept was finally adopted in NSW for the establishment of a Drug Crime Commission targeting drug trafficking and was then engaged as an adviser when it was subsequently reformed into the NSW Crime Commission to target all forms of organised crime.

In 1988, he was also appointed to a steering committee for the establishment of NSW's Independent Commission Against Corruption (ICAC). In 1989, he was again engaged to advise on pioneering legislation in NSW for confiscation of assets from criminals involved in organised crime.

In 1997, he prepared a report which resulted in the establishment of a Queensland Crime Commission – since merged with the Criminal Justice Commission to form the Crime and Misconduct Commission. In 2002 he was involved with the reformation of the National Crime Authority into the Australian Crime Commission.

During 2004, he was a participant in a Victoria Police Organised Crime Strategy Group which devised a five-year plan to confront Melbourne's underworld following a gangland war in which 28 people were murdered.

Now in retirement, while writing the occasional special article, he has been a regular witness before parliamentary committee hearings reviewing law enforcement efforts to combat organised crime.

His latest book, Fighting Organised Crime, Triumph and betrayal in a lifelong campaign, was published in 2009.

Honours
For his "service to the community and to journalism through the investigation and reporting of organised crime in Australia" Bottom was awarded the Medal of the Order of Australia (OAM) in the 1997 Australia Day Honours. He has also been made an honorary professor of journalism by Queensland's Jschool for his "outstanding contribution to journalism". He is a recipient of a lifetime achievement award from the Crime Writers Association of Australia.

Bibliography

Author
Behind the Barrier. Gladesville, N.S.W.: Gareth Powell Associates, 1969.
The Godfather in Australia: Organised Crime's Australian Connections. Terrey Hills, N.S.W.: A. H. & A. W. Reed, 1979.
Without Fear or Favour. South Melbourne: Sun Books, 1984.
Connections: Crime Rackets and Networks of Influence Down-Under. South Melbourne : Sun Books, 1985.
Connections II: Crime Rackets and Networks of Influence in Australia. South Melbourne : Sun Books, 1987.
Shadow of Shame: How the Mafia Got Away with the Murder of Donald Mackay. South Melbourne : Sun Books, 1988.
Bugged! : Legal Police Telephone Taps Expose the Mr Bigs of Australia's Drug Trade. South Melbourne : Sun, 1989.
Fighting Organised Crime: Triumph and Betrayal in a Lifelong Campaign. Nelson Bay, N.S.W.: BBP, 2009.

Co-authored
Inside Victoria: A Chronicle of Scandal – with John Silvester, Tom Noble and Paul Daley. Chippendale, N.S.W. : Pan Macmillan, 1991.

Edited
Big Shots: A Who's Who in Australian Crime by David Wilson and Lindsay Murdoch. South Melbourne: Sun Books, 1985.
Big Shots II by David Wilson and Paul Robinson. South Melbourne: Sun Books, 1987.

References

Australian investigative journalists
Year of birth missing (living people)
Recipients of the Medal of the Order of Australia
Living people
20th-century Australian journalists